This is a list of films which have placed number one at the weekend box office in Canada during 2006.

Weekend gross list

References

See also
List of Canadian films

Canada
2006
2006 in Canadian cinema